Out of the Folk Bag is an album by the Kenny Clarke/Francy Boland Big Band featuring performances recorded in Cologne in 1967 for the German Columbia label. The album features big band interpretations of traditional songs from around the world.

Track listing
 "Belgium: Nice Bunch" (Bosseret) - 2:58
 "England: Greensleeves" (Trad.) - 4:00
 "Italy: Funiculì, Funiculà" (Luigi Denza) - 3:27
 "Poland: Nights in Warsaw" (Trad.) - 3:07
 "USA: I Don't Want Nothin" (Trad.) - 4:25
 "Turkey: The Turk" (Trad.) - 1:52
 "Canada: Here The Good Wind Comes" (Trad.) - 5:49
 "Jugoslavia: Return" (Trad.) - 3:40
 "Sweden: Dear Old Stockholm" (Trad.) - 4:51

Personnel 
Kenny Clarke - drums
Francy Boland - piano, arranger
Benny Bailey, Jimmy Deuchar, Shake Keane, Idrees Sulieman - trumpet
Torolf Mølgaard, Nat Peck, Eric van Lier - trombone
Derek Humble - alto saxophone 
Carl Drevo, Johnny Griffin, Ronnie Scott - tenor saxophone 
Sahib Shihab - baritone saxophone, flute
Jimmy Woode - bass
Fats Sadi - vibraphone, percussion

References 

1967 albums
Kenny Clarke/Francy Boland Big Band albums
Columbia Records albums